Clayton is a suburb and a ward in the south of Newcastle-under-Lyme, in the unparished area of Newcastle-under-Lyme, in the Newcastle-under-Lyme district, in the county of Staffordshire, England.

Today
Clayton lies on the boundary between urban and rural Staffordshire, not far from Newcastle's border with the Borough of Stafford. The older part of the village stands on top of a hill, Northwood Lane, and some of these older houses were once gardeners' cottages on the Staffordshire estates of the Duke of Sutherland, who owned the Trentham Estate.

Towards Trent Vale is the Clayton Wood Training Ground and the football academy of Stoke City F.C.

Education
Clayton has one secondary school, Clayton Hall Academy. It has been developed on the site of the 19th century Clayton Hall and has around 1000 pupils  from all over Newcastle-under-Lyme. Until 2005 it was named Clayton High School. Then the school became a specialist school in Business & Enterprise and Modern Languages and was renamed Clayton Hall Business and Language College. The school converted to academy status in 2015 and was renamed again to Clayton Hall Academy.

Religion

The Catholic Church in Clayton is Our Lady and St Werburgh 
which has over 500 regular worshippers and the primary school judged by Ofsted as 'outstanding' in every category. The parish runs three youth groups, an over 55s group, a parents and toddlers group, various parish house groups as well as running LinkLine. LinkLine is a charity that rings up housebound elderly people for a regular weekly chat to show that they are loved and offer help in various ways.

There is also, based in the Parish Hall, one of the longest running Before and After School Clubs in the area, Wise Owls Care Club  which provides Before and After School Care and a Holiday Scheme for the children who attend the school.

Within Clayton is St James Church  which has a blue/green roof - originally copper, over the years with weather conditions has become this natural colour. This is an Anglican church where there is a Sunday School for children of any age. The school is held in the church hall at the same time as the main service is taken.

Another nearby church is Newcastle Baptist Church (NBC). Rainbows, Brownies and Guides (Girlguiding) are held in the onsite community hall and Beavers, Cubs and Scouts are held in the den along with Explorers. These are held on a week night and there are two scout groups to go to; on Monday the Spitfires and Wednesday the Harriers. They were named after planes and are used to tell the two groups apart as they are both called 79th NBC Scouts. In Explorers the Duke of Edinburgh award can be taken. The site where the church is situated used to be part of the United Reformed Church before it changed to NBC in 2012. Since then, extensive work has been undertaken to create a new entrance and a community building at the rear of the site.

Other amenities
There is a hospital and two hotels on Clayton Rd (the A519).

The hospital is the Nuffield Health North Staffordshire Hospital. It was opened in 1978 and is a purpose-built, well-equipped, private healthcare facility with two operating theatres, one minor/endoscopy suite and 40 en suite bedrooms.

Close to Junction 15 of the M6 is the Holiday Inn The other hotel (next to the Nuffield) used to be called the Ramada Clayton Lodge Hotel, then the Great National, Clayton and since early 2017 it has changed ownership and its name (again) and is called Clayton Lodge (again). Most guests writing about this hotel on Trip Advisor  classify it as "terrible". Various local authorities are concerned about its standards too. The Hotel closed in April 2020. In April 2021, a 'severe fire' broke out at Clayton Lodge, causing serious damage, closing the Hotel indefinetley.

At the top of Northwood Lane are the Clayton Community Centre  which has two rooms for hire, (one for dancing and one for meetings) and the Northwood Garden Centre. The Garden Centre  has a café with a good view across to the bet365 Stadium

Civil parish 
Clayton was formerly a township in the parish of Stoke-upon-Trent, from 1896 Clayton was a civil parish in its own right, on 1 April 1932 the parish was abolished and merged with Newcastle under Lyme. In 1931 the parish had a population of 264.

Transport

Buses
Bus services are operated by First Potteries (numbers 72 & 72A) as well as D&G Bus (number 2).

Road
The A519 south to Eccleshall and Newport, Shropshire runs through Clayton between Newcastle-under-Lyme and the M6 motorway at junction 15, where the A500 (located on the southern outskirts of Clayton) runs to Stoke-on-Trent. To the west, in the nearby ward of the Westlands is the A53, which runs to Market Drayton and Shrewsbury.

Notable people

 Clarice Cliff, (1899–1972) English ceramic artist active from 1922 to 1963, lived in Chetwynd House on Northwood Lane from 1940 until her death in 1972.
 Raymond Furnell (1936–2006) vicar of Clayton 1969–1975 and Dean of York from 1994–2003
 Peter Nigel Gill (born 1947 in Clayton) former English cricketer, right-handed batsman who bowled right-arm off break.
 Eddie Hall  (1988–) English professional strongman, notable for winning the World's Strongest Man 2017 competition and for being the world record deadlift holder, lifting 500 kg

See also
Listed buildings in Newcastle-under-Lyme

References

Populated places in Staffordshire
Former civil parishes in Staffordshire
Newcastle-under-Lyme